The Beautiful Poetry of Donald Trump is a 2017 satirical poetry collection written by Robert Sears and published by Canongate Books.

Contents
Written to resemble a poetry collection, the book contains old tweets and quotes attributed to Donald Trump which were compiled by the Trump Twitter Archive, the Trump Archive, and the American Presidency Project. There are seventeen "poems" in the book.

Reception
Writing for The Washington Post, Ron Charles cited The Beautiful Poetry of Donald Trump as a "curious response" to Trump's presidency. In June 2020, Joshua Tresvalles of the International Business Times listed the book as one of the "Top 10 Best Books About Donald Trump in 2020".

See also
 Bibliography of Donald Trump

References

External links
 

English-language books
2017 poetry books
Canongate Books books
Books about Donald Trump
American poetry collections